Spring Fever is a 1982 film directed by Joseph L. Scanlan, set in the world of competitive tennis. It was produced by Amulet Pictures with the participation of the Canadian Film Development Corporation and Famous Players Limited. The original title for the film was Sneakers, but was changed to Spring Fever when released.

The film follows a Las Vegas teen (Carling Bassett) as she participates in the National Junior Tennis Championship in Tampa, Florida with her showgirl mother (Susan Anton).

Plot
Stevie Castle is a Las Vegas showgirl whose teen daughter K.C. demonstrates a promising aptitude for tennis. When K.C. enters a local tournament, she encounters hostility and snobbery from the tennis crowd due to her mother's profession.

Cast
 Carling Bassett as Karen "K.C." Castle
 Susan Anton as Stevie Castle
 Jessica Walter as Celia Berryman
 Frank Converse as Lewis Berryman
 Stephen Young as Neil Berryman 
 Shawn Foltz as Melissa "Missy" Berryman
 David Main as Van Beechum
 Briane Nasimok as Pedro the cab driver

Soundtrack
 "Hit Me with Your Best Shot"  (Eddie Schwartz) - Pat Benatar
 "The Long Arm"  (Freddy Moore)  - The Nu Kats
 "Turn Me Loose"  (Paul Dean - Mike Reno) - Loverboy
 "Just One Chance to Be Free"  (Fred Mollin)  - Taffy McElroy
 "Do It All Night"  (Paul Sabu) - Barbara Law
 "Easy Lover"  (Fred Mollin)  - Susan Anton
 "Shake Your Bait"  (Paul Sabu - Harry Hinde) - Barbara Law

Reception
Roger Ebert gave the film one-and-half of four possible stars in his March 17, 1983 review in the Chicago Sun-Times. Ebert wrote that the film "does not show anybody even slightly resembling any of the three people in the ad. Nor does it have a scene in which two girls and a boy mess around at the beach."

References

External links
 

1982 films
Canadian sports drama films
American sports drama films
Films scored by Fred Mollin
Canadian independent films
English-language Canadian films
Tennis films
Films directed by Joseph L. Scanlan
1980s English-language films
1980s American films
1980s Canadian films